Harput meatballs originated in the Eastern Anatolian city of Harput (today Elazığ, in Turkey). It is made by adding lean ground beef, fine bulgur, cracked wheat, egg, tomato paste, salt, spices, parsley and basil. They are known also as large meatballs.

See also 
 Tabriz meatballs 
 Sulu köfte
 Ciorbă de perişoare
 Smyrna meatballs
 Yuvarlak
 List of meatball dishes

Notes and references 

Kofta